Magadania is a genus of flowering plants belonging to the family Apiaceae.

Its native range is the Russian Far East.

Species
Species:

Magadania olaensis 
Magadania victoris

References

Apioideae
Apioideae genera